George William James Chandos Brudenell-Bruce, 6th Marquess of Ailesbury,  (21 May 1873 – 4 August 1961), styled Earl of Cardigan between 1894 and 1911, was a British peer and an officer of the auxiliary forces. According to his hand-written memoirs, available at the Wiltshire and Swindon History Centre, he went by the name Chandos.

Background and education
Brudenell-Bruce was the son of Henry Brudenell-Bruce, 5th Marquess of Ailesbury and Georgiana Sophia Maria Pinckney. He was educated at Westminster School. He succeeded his father in the marquessate on the latter's death on 10 March 1911.

Career
Lord Ailesbury served in the 3rd (Highland Borderers Militia) Battalion, Argyll and Sutherland Highlanders; the Royal Wiltshire Yeomanry; the Middlesex Yeomanry; the Wiltshire Regiment; and the Royal Field Artillery

Lord Cardigan was promoted to the rank of captain in the Royal Wiltshire Yeomanry on 3 September 1898, supernumerary to the establishment. He fought with the regiment in the Second Boer War, for which he was mentioned in dispatches, and was appointed a Companion of the Distinguished Service Order in November 1900. He was confirmed as a captain on the establishment in May 1902. He fought in the Great War, during which he was again mentioned in dispatches and he received the Territorial Decoration for his service in the Territorial Force. Postwar he commanded 220 (Wiltshire) Battery in 55th (Wessex) Brigade, Royal Field Artillery.

He was invested as a Knight of Grace of the Order of St John of Jerusalem. He was appointed a Deputy Lieutenant of Wiltshire on 19 July 1920, and was a Justice of the Peace.

He was involved in conservative and right-wing politics and during the 1920s was a member of the reactionary British Fascists.

According to his son Cedric (See 7th Marquess of Ailesbury), George "Chandos" was involved in the process of converting the family estate and its surrounding forest into a munitions depot and military base during WWII, an ideal location, as the trees provided cover from Nazi spy planes.

Family
Married three times, Lord Ailesbury married his first wife, Caroline Sydney Anne Madden, daughter of John Madden and Caroline Clements, on 21 March 1903. They had three children, Cedric Brudenell-Bruce, 7th Marquess of Ailesbury (1904–1974); Lady Ursula Daphne Brudenell-Bruce (1905–1991), who married Alfred Thomas Taylor in 1944; and Lady Rosemary Enid Brudenell-Bruce (1907–1985).  Caroline died on 5 May 1941.

Lord Ailesbury then married Mabel Irene Lindsay, daughter of John Samuel Lindsay, on 21 February 1945. She died on 26 June 1954. Finally, he married as his third wife Alice Maude Emily Pinhey, daughter of Captain John Forbes Pinhey, on 9 July 1955. She died on 9 February 1960.

References

'AILESBURY', Who Was Who, A & C Black, 1920–2007; online edn, Oxford University Press, Dec 2007

External links

1873 births
1961 deaths
Deputy Lieutenants of Wiltshire
Argyll and Sutherland Highlanders officers
British Army personnel of World War I
Wiltshire Regiment officers
British Army personnel of the Second Boer War
Companions of the Distinguished Service Order
George
British fascists
Royal Wiltshire Yeomanry officers
Earls of Cardigan
6